Mount Hope Cemetery in Bangor, Maine, is the second oldest garden cemetery in the United States.  It was designed by architect Charles G. Bryant in 1834 and built by the Bangor Horticultural Society soon after, the same year that Bangor was incorporated as a city. The cemetery was modeled after Mount Auburn Cemetery (1831) in Boston, Massachusetts.  Bangor was at that time a frontier boom-town, and much of its architecture and landscaping was modeled after that of Boston. The site has been listed on the National Register of Historic Places.

History
It did not include all of the cemetery's central hill; instead, it cut across the crest of the hill and met up with what would later be Mount Hope Avenue. Approximately  was to be set aside for horticultural activities, and the rest of the land was to be used as a cemetery.

This was the preferred resting ground for Bangor's 19th- and early-20th-century elite. The cemetery includes the gravesites of Hannibal Hamlin, a U.S. Vice President who had also held office as Congressman, US Senator and Governor of Maine, a U.S. Senator, ten U.S. Congressmen, two U.S. Ambassadors, four Governors of Maine, eight Civil War Generals, and numerous "lumber barons" and other local businessmen and politicians. Actors Richard Golden and Ralph Sipperly are also buried there.

Representation in other media
The movie Pet Sematary was filmed in Mount Hope Cemetery.

Notable burials
 Franklin Muzzy (1806–1873), 32nd President of the Maine Senate
 Hannibal Hamlin (1809-1891), 15th Vice President of the United States, 26th Governor of Maine

See also
National Register of Historic Places listings in Penobscot County, Maine

Notes

References

External links

 
 

Cemeteries established in the 1830s
Cemeteries in Penobscot County, Maine
Buildings and structures in Bangor, Maine
Cemeteries on the National Register of Historic Places in Maine
Tourist attractions in Bangor, Maine
Historic districts on the National Register of Historic Places in Maine
National Register of Historic Places in Bangor, Maine
 
Rural cemeteries